Dunman High School (DHS) is a co-educational government autonomous secondary school located in Kallang, Singapore, offering the Integrated Programme and the Special Assistance Plan (SAP). It was originally located in West Kallang.

Since adopting the Integrated Programme in 2007, it has produced three President's Scholars. It is also one of the largest government schools in Singapore by physical area.

History

Kallang West Government Chinese Middle School 
On 14 October 1956, during the Chinese middle school riots, the Ministry of Education established the predecessor of Dunman High School, Kallang West Government Chinese Middle School, along with other schools like River Valley High School and Hua Yi Secondary School. It was renamed Dunman High School after Thomas Dunman.

In the 1956 riots, Chinese middle-school students who subscribed to the communist ideology staged sit-ins and demonstrations, disrupted classes, and in effect shut their schools down. The function of the newly established Kallang West Government Chinese Middle School was to allow students who had no wish to be embroiled in communism to have a place to study. The premises of a newly built primary school at Mountbatten Road were loaned, and the initial enrolment included about 100 boys from The Chinese High School, with 10 teachers. In December 1957, the school moved to Dunman Road and was renamed "Dunman Government Chinese Middle School".

Designation of Special Assistance Plan
In 1979, the school was selected to be one of the nine Special Assistance Plan (SAP) secondary schools. It was renamed "Dunman High School" and began to offer both English and Chinese languages at the first-language level. When the Music Elective Programme (MEP) was introduced by the MOE in 1982, DHS was selected to implement the programme for musically gifted students.

In 1990, the school expanded by taking over the neighbouring former premises of Dunman Secondary School at Dunman Road. It then became a single-session school (previously the school was divided into the "morning session" and "afternoon session" so that two classes of students could share a classroom). It was one of six schools to go autonomous in 1994. The school moved to its current location in Tanjong Rhu on 27 May 1995. It was made the 7th Gifted Education Programme centre in Singapore in 1997.

50th Anniversary
A time capsule was launched on the opening ceremony of DHS's 50th anniversary celebrations on 31 March 2006. It is meant to be opened in 2031, on the school's 75th anniversary. Items such as the DHS uniform and the 2006 student handbook were placed in it. A letter by the current principal of the school was also included. In addition, a Heritage Run was organised that day. There were also performances, including a dance by the school's Chinese Society, and a drumming performance by the percussionists from Chinese Orchestra and Symphonic Band. A 50th anniversary song, written by Kelvin Ang Chin Yuan, was played by Clara Ng Yi Wen and sung by the school.

Incorporation of Dunman High Programme
From 2005, the school offered implemented a customised version of the six-year Integrated Programme called the Dunman High Programme (DHP), which allows all students to bypass the O-Level examinations and directly take the A-Level examinations. To meet the needs of the Integrated Programme, the school moved to a holding school in the former Raffles Junior College campus at Mount Sinai in December 2006 to allow for upgrading of the current site at Tanjong Rhu.

The land area of the expanded campus increased from four hectares to seven hectares, making Dunman High School one of the biggest government-aided schools in Singapore. In December 2008 the classrooms, general office and staff rooms of the Tanjong Rhu campus were completed, and the school moved back to the Tanjong Rhu campus. On 2 January 2009 the school opened to a new year with an opening ceremony named "Homecoming" (回家) to welcome students and staff to the upgraded campus.

On 5 September 2017, Dunman High was featured in an episode of Channel 8's "When The Bell Rings" documentary series. This eight episode documentary series featured eight Special Assistance Plan (SAP) Schools in Singapore, and told stories of their transformation through the times. The episode on Dunman High was the last episode to be aired.

Joint Admissions Exercise
On 21 September 2018, the Ministry of Education announced that the final two remaining schools offering the IP - Dunman High School and River Valley High School - would be participating in the Joint Admissions Exercise in future. The following year in 2019, Dunman High School took in its first batch of O-level JAE students.

School identity and culture

Dunman High School's Chinese name Démíng (德明) is a transliteration of "Dunman". The meaning of its name in Chinese is derived from a line in the Book of Rites (大学之道，在明明德) which is a statement that has influenced the Emperors of the Han, Tang and Song dynasties in Imperial China. It can be roughly translated as "the Dao (path) to the greatest learning lies in understanding the brightest virtues".

School crest

The school crest of Dunman High School was designed by Chen Jen Hao, its second principal, and Liu Kang, a pioneer in local fine art and former art teacher of the school. The two Chinese characters read, from right to left, "Dé míng", the Chinese name of the school. The characters are written in seal script.

The red colour symbolises passion and the drive for success. The blue colour signifies peace and dignity, while the circular border represents wholeness and unity, as well as the pursuit of universality, as defined in the Confucian classic Book of Rites.

School song
Dunman High School preserved its school song in Mandarin Chinese. The lyrics were originally written as prose by a chemistry teacher of the school in 1953.

Campus 
Dunman High School is currently one of the largest government schools in Singapore in terms of physical area.

Academic information 
Incorporated within the six-year Dunman High Programme (DHP) are the Junior High (JH) and Senior High (SH) sections, which leads to the Singapore-Cambridge GCE Advanced Level examination. The school-wide Integrated Programme offered enables students to bypass the Singapore-Cambridge GCE Ordinary Level examination that is taken in the Special/Express course. Dunman High Junior High uses a Grade Point Average scoring system, with the following scoring system. As of 2019, the scoring system for Junior High students has been updated to include B+ and C+ grades.

DHS also organises academic competitions and conferences, both for its students and external participants. A variety of academic programmes, hosted by both the school as well as the Ministry of Education, are offered to students with the potential to excel.

Special programmes 
Various special programmes are offered in the school, such as the Bicultural Studies Programme (BSP), the Art Special Programme (ASP) and the Music Elective Programme (MEP). These programmes offer a degree of specialisation that is generally not attainable in the standard curriculum, enabling students in the school to explore respective fields to a greater degree. On top of these programmes, Dunman High also offers a wider variety of GCE 'A' Level Examination subjects, including the newly included subject H2 Translation, as well as courses like H2 China Studies in Chinese. Extensive support and guidance is available for students who are interested in furthering their interests with H3 subjects.

Special programmes offered in school are listed below:
 Bicultural Studies Programme (BSP) (C)
 Chinese Language Elective Programme (CLEP) (C) 
 School-Based Gifted Education (SBGE)
 Thinking Research Programme (TRP)
 Malay Special Programme (MSP)
 Music Elective Programme (MEP)
 Art Special Programme (ASP)
 Dunman High Leadership Programme (DHLP)
 Future Problem Solving Programme (FPSP)
 Young Writers' Programme (YWP)

Co-curricular activities
Dunman High School offers Co-curricular Activities (CCAs), including competitive sports, uniformed groups, musical groups and clubs and societies. The school's traditional forte has been Chinese orchestral music. The Uniformed Groups have a strong presence in Dunman High School, with Saint John Ambulance Brigade, Scouts, Girl Guides and National Police Cadet Corps achieving honours.

The Co-curricular Activities (CCAs) offered by Dunman High School is listed below:

Sports and Games

 Air Weapons Club
 Badminton
 Basketball
 Softball
 Table Tennis
 Track & Field
 Volleyball
 Wushu
 Sailing Club (Senior High)
 Bowling (Senior High)
 Golf (Senior High)
 Netball (Senior High)
 Outdoor Activities Club (Senior High)
 Singapore Youth Flying Club (SYFC) (Senior High)
 Soccer (Senior High)
 Taekwondo (Senior High)

Performing Arts

 Chinese Society
 Beijing Opera
 Dance
 Drama
 Chinese Orchestra
 Guzheng Ensemble
 Choir
 English Drama Society
 Dance
 Drama
 String Ensemble (Junior High)
 Symphonic Band

Uniformed Groups (Junior High)

 Girl Guides
 National Police Cadet Corps
 Scouts
 St John's Brigade

Clubs and Societies

 Art Club
 Chinese Society
 Literary
 Calligraphy
 Community Service Club
 STEAM Collective (Junior High)
 Infocomm Club (Senior High)
 Library Society
 Lion Dance (Scout) (Junior High)
 Mathematics Society
 Mind Sports Club
 Oratorical Society
 Photographic Society
 Robotics Club (Senior High)
 Science Society
 Anime, Comics and Gaming (Senior High)
 Culinary Club (Senior High)
 Environmental Club (Senior High)
 International Strategic Affairs Council (ISAC) (Senior High)
 Publications (Senior High)
 Mass Communications Society (Senior High)

Student Interest Groups (Senior High)

 Beijing Opera
 Japanese Cultural Club
 Malay Society
 Medical Society
 Music Society
 The Crew (AV Support for Events)
 Touch Rugby
 Uniformed Group (UG) Council

Student Council 
The student council is the student welfare body that work closely with the school committee to bring forth initiatives and changes for the school. They are also responsible for the daily functions of the school.

Relations with other schools 
It is not officially affiliated with any other school. However, it holds an annual sports meet with Chung Cheng High School (Main), Ngee Ann Secondary School and Temasek Secondary School called the Four-School Combined Athletics Meet since 1980, in which students aged 13 to 16 from the four schools compete in Track & Field events. The original four schools were Dunman, Chung Cheng High School (Main), Chung Cheng High School (Branch) (now Chung Cheng High School (Yishun)) and Yuying Secondary School.

Notable alumni

 Sam Goi, Executive Chairman of Tee Yih Jia, 23rd Richest in Singapore ($1.7Bn)
Chua Thian Poh, Chairman & CEO of Ho Bee Land, 34th Richest in Singapore ($1.3Bn)
Ng Ser Miang, Vice President of the International Olympic Committee, Founder of Trans-Island Bus Services
Douglas Foo, Founder & Chairman, Sakae Holdings and Nominated Member of Parliament (2018-2020)
Thomas Chua, Chairman & Managing Director, Teckwah Industrial, Past President, SCCI, former Nominated Member of Parliament.
Low Yen Ling, Member of Parliament for Chua Chu Kang GRC
 Poh Li San, Member of Parliament for Sembawang GRC
 Josephine Teo, Minister for Communications and Information
 Alex Yam, Member of Parliament for Marsiling-Yew Tee GRC
Dr Ong Seh Hong, Member of Parliament (2001-2011)
Vincy Chan, Hong Kong singer and artiste
 Curley G, Chinese singer-songwriter and member of BonBon Girls 303
 Kuo Pao Kun, playwright, theatre director and arts activist

See also 
 Education in Singapore

References

External links 

School website
Dunman High School Alumni Association

Kallang
Autonomous schools in Singapore
Educational institutions established in 1956
Schools in Central Region, Singapore
Secondary schools in Singapore
Schools offering Integrated Programme in Singapore
Boarding schools in Singapore
Junior colleges in Singapore
1956 establishments in Malaya